Eucalyptus lacrimans, commonly known as weeping snow gum, is a species of small tree that is endemic to New South Wales. It has smooth white bark, lance-shaped adult leaves with more or less parallel veins, flower buds in groups of seven to eleven or more, white flowers and cup-shaped, conical or barrel-shaped fruit.

Description
It has smooth white bark with patches of cream or grey and its branchlets are glaucous. It has a sparse crown with weeping branches. Adult leaves are the same glossy green on both sides and have more or less parallel veins. Flowering  occurs between December and January and the flowers are white.

Taxonomy and naming
Eucalyptus lacrimans was first formally described in 1991 by Laawrie Johnson and Ken Hill from a specimen collected on the Long Plain in 1984 and the description was published in the journal Telopea. The specific epithet (lacrimans) is a Latin word meaning 'weeping', in reference to the distinctive weeping branches of this species.

Distribution and habitat
The weeping snow gum grows on more or less flat, treeless plains in subalpine areas near Adaminaby, Kiandra and Rules Point in southern New South Wales.

References

lacrimans
Myrtales of Australia
Flora of New South Wales
Trees of Australia
Plants described in 1991
Taxa named by Lawrence Alexander Sidney Johnson
Taxa named by Ken Hill (botanist)